The 1972 Summer Paralympics, the fourth edition of the Paralympic Games, were held in Heidelberg, West Germany, from 2 to 11 August 1972. The games ended 15 days before the 1972 Summer Olympics held in Munich, also in West Germany.

Sports 
As with previous Paralympics, the 1972 games were intended for wheelchair athletes only. However, demonstration events such as goalball and a 100 m sprint for the visually impaired allowed visually impaired competitors to participate for the first time.

 Archery
 Athletics
 Dartchery
 Goalball (demonstration sport)
 Lawn bowls
 Snooker
 Swimming
 Table tennis
 Weightlifting
 Wheelchair basketball
 Wheelchair fencing

Medal table 

The top ten listed NOCs by number of gold medals are listed below. The host nation, West Germany, is highlighted.

Participating delegations 
Forty-one delegations took part in the Heidelberg Paralympics. Bahamas, Brazil, Czechoslovakia, Egypt, Hong Kong, Hungary, Kenya, Malaysia, Mexico, Peru, Poland, Romania, Uganda and Yugoslavia competed for the first time.

Between 1964 to 1976,South Africa was competing at the Paralympics for the third time. Although banned from the Olympic Games due to its policy of apartheid, it was not banned from the Paralympics until 1980, and West Germany, as host country, did not object to its participation.

Rhodesia competed for the last time. Its invitation to take part in the 1972 Summer Olympics was withdrawn by the International Olympic Committee four days before the opening ceremony, in response to African countries' protests against the Rhodesian government. But as the Paralympics that year were held before the Olympics (and between 1968 to 1984 in a independently from ), Rhodesia was able to take part in the 1972 Paralympic Games.

References 

 
Paralympics
P
Multi-sport events in West Germany
Sport in Heidelberg
Paralympic Games
Summer Paralympics
Sports competitions in Baden-Württemberg
Summer Paralympic Games
1970s in Baden-Württemberg
Summer Paralympics